Stephen Forde (29 August 1914 – 1992) was an English footballer who played as a full-back in the Football League for Rotherham United and West Ham United.

Playing career
Forde began his career as a junior at right-back, captaining his school team, and playing  with South Kirkby Common Road, before joining South Kirkby. In January 1933 he joined Sheffield Wednesday, who played Ford as a centre-half. After just two months at Wednesday he moved to Rotherham United, where he only missed two first team matches in four seasons.

In January 1937, West Ham United paid a record fee of around £3,000, to beat many other clubs to the signing of Forde from Rotherham. He was initially recruited for the reserve team as a replacement for Bill Adams. He became a regular for the Irons' second string as a full-back, where he formed a partnership with Alf Chalkley. He made his first-team debut on 2 April 1938, a 1–3 loss against Tottenham Hotspur.

Wartime football
During World War II Forde worked in a colliery whilst making guest appearances primarily for West Ham, where he played in the 1940 Football League War Cup semi-final win against Fulham. In 1943 he made guest appearances for Hartlepool United, and also featured for Sunderland and Swindon Town.

After the war, he returned to competitive football with West Ham – his return 7 years, 9 months and 19 days after his previous game remains as the second-longest period between first-team appearances, behind Reg Attwell. He became a regular feature for West Ham and was an ever-present during the 1947–48 season. He retired in 1951 having made 170 Second Division appearances for the club.

Coaching career
After ending his League career in 1951, he spent time as manager of Western League team Penzance.

Family
His younger brother, John, was also a footballer who played for Stoke City and Gainsborough Trinity.

Notes

References

1914 births
1992 deaths
People from South Kirkby
English footballers
Association football defenders
Sheffield Wednesday F.C. players
South Kirkby Colliery F.C. players
Rotherham United F.C. players
West Ham United F.C. players
Hartlepool United F.C. wartime guest players
Sunderland A.F.C. wartime guest players
Swindon Town F.C. wartime guest players
English Football League players
English football managers